The 2016 UCF Knights football team represented the University of Central Florida in the 2016 NCAA Division I FBS football season. The Knights were members of the East Division of the American Athletic Conference (The American) and played their home games at Bright House Networks Stadium on UCF's main campus in Orlando, Florida. They were led by first-year head coach Scott Frost. They finished the regular season 6–6, 4–4 in American Athletic Conference play, finishing in third place in the East Division. They were invited to the Cure Bowl, where they lost to Arkansas State.

This was the second season where UCF would be bowl eligible just one year after going winless. The 2016 season served as a transition between the winless 2015 season and the undefeated season one year later in 2017.

Personnel

Coaching staff

Schedule

The game between UCF and Tulane was originally scheduled for October 7, 2016, but was postponed due to the effects of Hurricane Matthew.
Source:

Game summaries

South Carolina State

In Scott Frost's first game as head coach of UCF, the Knights broke a 13-game losing streak with their first win since December 4, 2014 at East Carolina. The Knights dominated defensively, recording their first shut out since November 28, 2014 at USF, and their first home shutout since October 29, 2011 vs Memphis. The Knights also forced 3 turnovers, including two fumbles and an interception by Shaquill Griffin. Additionally, the four field goals scored by Matthew Wright are the best of his career. Offensively, the 38 points scored by UCF are the most since November 22, 2014. UCF has also recorded two rushing touchdowns for the first time since 2014, one by Justin Holman and one by Dontravious Wilson. Justin Holman had a slow first half only finishing 6-of-17 passes, but after a strong second half performance of 8-of-11 passes, Holman finished 14–28 for 193 yards and 2 touchdowns, and rushing for 40 yards and a touchdown. Tre'Quan Smith and Tristan Payton have also scored touchdowns.

at Michigan

In a game plagued with special team and quarterback problems, Michigan took an early 31–0 lead into the second quarter. Justin Holman struggled tremendously in the passing game, only completing 3 of his 11 passes for just 19 yards, and fumbled the ball. After Holman went down with an injury just before halftime, Nick Patti came in, also going 3-for-11 for 37 yards. Additionally, Michigan blocked two punts and a field goal attempt in the first quarter.

Despite the trouble, there were some bright spots, mainly in the running game. UCF outrushed the Wolverines 275–119 yards, including an 87-yard rushing touchdown in the second quarter by Adrian Killins, UCF's longest rushing touchdown since November 3, 2007 against Marshall. Additionally, Dontravious Wilson scored a 34-yard rushing touchdown in the third quarter.

Maryland

This game was the first start for McKenzie Milton as quarterback for UCF. Milton finished with 21-for-36 for 260 yards and 1 interception leading UCF to their first overtime game since October 9, 2014 vs BYU as well as their first double-overtime game since October 13, 2012 vs Southern Miss. Some of his key plays were a 31-yard touchdown pass to Tre'Quan Smith to force double-overtime, as well as a 7-yard quarterback keeper that gave UCF a 14–10 lead in the third quarter. Unfortunately, Milton's turnovers were costly as he fumbled the ball in double-overtime with what seemed to be an incomplete pass, but the officials ruled it as a fumble and the Knights lost in a heartbreaker. Additionally, this was also the highest attendance in Bright House Networks Stadium since September 20, 2014 vs Bethune-Cookman.

at FIU

In McKenzie Milton's second start as UCF's quarterback, the Knights returned to the win column with their highest scoring game since November 22, 2014 against SMU and the most in an away game since October 27, 2012. UCF would score on their first drive with a run from Dontravious Wilson, and would complete a 2-point conversion to Jordan Franks, going up 8–0. FIU would then score next to make it 8–7. That would be the last time FIU scored until the fourth as the Knights would counter with a 45–0 run by just into the fourth quarter, which included 2 more rushing touchdowns from Wilson, his career high, a 21-yard touchdown pass caught by Jordan Akins, and a 61-yard run by Adrian Killins. The 3 rushing touchdowns by Wilson are also the most by a UCF player since Storm Johnson's Fiesta Bowl game. UCF would also record 501 yards of offense, the most since November 14, 2014 against Tulsa, and 6 rushing touchdowns, the most since September 3, 2011 against Charleston Southern. Additionally, the defense, while only recording one turnover, an interception by Drico Johnson, stepped up against FIU, with Shaquem Griffin recording a career-high 2 sacks in the game.

at East Carolina

With McKenzie Milton down with an injury, Justin Holman returned as the starting quarterback for this game. After a scoreless first quarter, ECU scored first to go up 7–0. That was the last lead the Pirates had as UCF immediately countered with a 100-yard kickoff return by Adrian Killins, the fourth player in UCF history to do so. After taking a 16–7 halftime lead, UCF scored again to make it 23–7. The Pirates came back by the end of the third, cutting the lead to 23–21, one of their touchdowns coming off a Justin Holman interception. UCF then responded with a Dontravious Wilson TD as well as a pick six by Brendon Hayes in less than 20 seconds and the Pirates would never come close again. While Holman did struggle, only going 11–29 and throwing 2 interceptions, the running game was strong with 217 yards, including a 35-yard TD run by Dontravious Wilson, his career long, as well as Jawon Hamilton's first career touchdown and a career-long 47-yard run by Taj McGowan. The defense made the biggest difference, with three interceptions, two fumbles, as well as recording a safety and a pick six by Brendon Hayes.

This was UCF's first conference win since December 4, 2014, their last road meeting against East Carolina, as well as Scott Frost's first conference win as head coach. This is also the first time the Knights scored touchdowns on offense, defense, and special teams since November 20, 2010, against Tulane. Now UCF is down 10–5 in the all-time series versus East Carolina, with the Knights winning 4 of their last 6 games, including their last two match-ups in Greenville.

Temple

UCF would get off to a great offensive start, taking an early 25–7 lead. Tre'Quan Smith would catch a 55-yard Touchdown pass just over a minute in the game, Adrian Killins would catch a 16-yard Touchdown pass, and McKenzie Milton would run 63 yards for a touchdown. From there, UCF would struggle for the rest of the game as Temple's defense would keep the Knights scoreless for the rest of the game. Temple would score a touchdown before halftime cutting UCF's lead to 25–14. UCF would keep their lead until one second left in the 4th quarter when Temple scored a game-winning touchdown to take a 26–25 lead. Temple would stop Adrian Killins in the following kickoff, sealing their win.

at UConn

UCF would start off slow as they would allow UCONN an early 13–0 lead, with two field goals and a touchdown. Afterwards with 6:50 left in the 2nd quarter, McKenzie Milton would connect for 22 yards with Dredrick Snelson for his first career TD, cutting the lead to 13–7. The defense would hold UCONN to another field goal before McKenzie Milton connected with Jordan Akins for a 19-yard TD with one second left before halftime, cutting UCONN's lead to 16–14. Coming out from halftime, UCF would score on their first drive with a 39-yard TD pass to Adrian Killins, taking the lead for the first time in the game. From there, the defense would shut out UCONN and Matthew Wright would score a 50-yard field goal, his career long. UCONN's last drive would end at the UCF 21 yard line where the defense forces a turnover on downs with 1:38 left. This would be UCF's first win over UCONN since 2013, as well as their first at East Hartford. After the game, UCF did not accept the trophy for the Civil Conflict rivalry, or even acknowledge it, leaving the trophy at Rentschler Field. Additionally, McKenzie Milton threw for a season high 317 yards and three touchdowns and would go 29-for-45.

at Houston

UCF would get off to another fast start, taking a 21–3 lead over the Cougars by halftime. Adrian Killins would score on a 6-yard run, Dontravious Wilson would score on a 1-yard run, and Jawon Hamilton would run for 28 yards for a TD before halftime. The defense would get 3 interceptions and hold Houston to only a field goal. Coming out of the half, UCF would force another turnover, a fumble, which would lead to UCF scoring a field goal, taking a 24–3 lead. From there, Houston would storm back and score 28 unanswered points to take a 31–24 lead and force four turnovers against UCF: two fumbles, one interception, and a turnover on downs. This is the second time this year that UCF would lose after taking a large lead.

Tulane

The game, originally scheduled for a 7:30 pm kickoff on October 6 to be televised on ESPNU, was moved to November 5 due to Hurricane Matthew. The game was moved to November 5 because both teams, coincidentally, had scheduled bye weeks for that week. UCF would start off with a fumble in the first play of the game, and Tulane would score a TD right after, with the Knights blocking the extra point. McKenzie Milton struggled throughout the game only completing 9 out of 20 of his passes and throwing an interception, however he did run for a 1-yd TD taking the lead, 7–6, with 7:39 left in the second quarter. The defense, however, is where the Knights thrived in this game. In the second half, the defense would completely pulverize the Green Wave, shutting them out. Additionally, UCF would score a school record three defensive TDs. First Drico Johnson would score on a 30-yard fumble return for a TD with 7:23 left in the third quarter. Then Shaquill Griffin would score a 33-yard interception return for a TD just a minute after. With 11:23 left in the fourth, Drico Johnson would score another pick six from 86 yards out. At the end of the game, Justin Holman would enter for the first time since East Carolina, and would add the exclamation point for UCF with an 80-yard drive capped off by a 1-yard TD run.

Cincinnati

This is the second meeting between the UCF Knights and the Cincinnati Bearcats. Through yet another dominating defensive performance, UCF would win their 6th game, becoming bowl eligible after failing to win a single game last year. This is the second time in UCF history that the Knights would return to a bowl game after going winless the previous year, the other time being in 2005. The defense held Cincinnati to only a field goal and forced 5 turnovers from the Bearcats: a turnover on downs, two interceptions made by Seyvon Lowry and Brandon Scott, a fumble recovery by Shaquem Griffin, and, most notably, a blocked punt that was returned for a touchdown by Justin McDonald. UCF would also score on offense with a 1-yard pass by McKenzie Milton to Dredrick Snelson and a 25-yard run by Jawon Hamilton. McKenzie Milton would finish the game 22-of-34 for 150 yards and a touchdown, while Jawon Hamilton led the team in rushing for 81 yards and a touchdown in 17 carries, and Tre'Quan Smith led the team in receptions catching 4 receptions for 38 yards.

Tulsa

UCF would start off the game on a high note with a pick six by DJ Killings with a 2-pt conversion. Tulsa would respond with 2 touchdowns, one of which they were able to convert from a fumble. UCF would fight back in the 2nd quarter to tie the game at the half, 14–14. In the second half, Tulsa would dominate, scoring 3 straight touchdowns, taking a 35–14 lead. UCF would score one more touchdown by Adrian Killins to make it 35–20. McKenzie Milton completed 25 of his 51 passes for 233 yards. UCF's rushing game struggled as Milton led the team with 12 carries for 37 yards. Tre'Quan Smith led the team in receptions with 5 catches for 71 yards.

at South Florida

UCF would score first with a 3-yard run by Jawon Hamilton, but USF would respond with a 43 yard run by Marlon Mack for a touchdown. UCF would also fumble the ball afterwards with Juwuan Brown returning it for a touchdown. USF would lead 24–7 before UCF would respond with a 72 yard touchdown by Tre'Quan Smith in a trick play pass by Tristan Payton, making it 24–14 at the half. In the third quarter, Quinton Flowers would score a touchdown run from 62 yards, but UCF would fight back with a field goal and a touchdown by Taj McGowan, making it a one-possession game at the end of the third, 31–24. In the 4th quarter, however, any hope for a comeback would disintegrate as USF would score on a 24-yard run by Quinton Flowers as well as a field goal to make it 41–24. Milton who threw 2 interceptions in the game was later pulled out and Justin Holman played late in the 4th. He completed a 41-yard touchdown pass to Tre'Quan Smith. USF would score again with 11 seconds to go to make it 48–31. UCF gained 402 total yards and 22 first downs, but the Knights struggled with 3 turnovers. McKenzie Milton would lead the team in passing yards, completing 26 out of 42 of his passes for 225 yards, but throwing 2 interceptions. Jawon Hamilton would lead the team in rushing for 54 yards with 14 carries and a touchdown. Tre'Quan Smith led the team with in receiving yards with 7 receptions for 183 yards and 2 touchdowns.

vs Arkansas State–Cure Bowl

In a game plagued by offensive and special teams struggles, UCF would be dominated by Arkansas State. Arkansas State would first score from a blocked punt return for a touchdown in the end zone. Arkansas State would lead by as much as 17–0 before UCF scored with 9:31 in the 2nd quarter by an 11 yard reception by Taylor Oldham, his first career touchdown. UCF would make it a one-possession game at the half, 17–10. Once again, UCF struggled in the second half and would be outscored 14–3. UCF's defense held Arkansas State to 8 first downs, but the offense was unable to capitalize on drives and special teams struggled tremendously with a blocked punt return for a touchdown. Additionally, special teams gave up 2 more turnovers, with a fumble from Hayden Jones on a kickoff return and a muffed punt by Chris Johnson. Each of these special teams struggles set up the Red Wolves with excellent field position where they scored 2 of their touchdowns. McKenzie Milton led the team with 22 of 39 passes complete for 175 yards and a touchdown. UCF's running game once again struggled with Jawon Hamilton leading with 10 carries for 14 yards. Taylor Oldham led the passing yards with 5 receptions for 56 yards and a touchdown.

References

UCF
UCF Knights football seasons
UCF Knights football